Yed or YED may refer to:

Income elasticity of demand
yEd is a freely available, multi-platform, general-purpose diagramming software.
the name of two stars in the constellation Ophiuchus:
 Delta Ophiuchi (Yed Prior)
 Epsilon Ophiuchi (Yed Posterior)